Loe van Belle (born 24 January 2002) is a Dutch professional racing cyclist, who currently rides for UCI Continental team .

In September 2022,  announced that van Belle would continue to compete for Jumbo-Visma Development Team until the end of 2023 and from 2024 onwards switch to the World Tour team for the following 2 years.

Major results

2019
 National Junior Track Championships
1st  Omnium
1st  Individual pursuit
2nd Points race
3rd Team pursuit
 2nd Omloop der Vlaamse Gewesten
 9th Danilith Nokere Koerse Juniors
 9th Overall Oberösterreich Juniorenrundfahrt
 10th Kuurne–Brussels–Kuurne Juniors
 10th Overall SPIE Internationale Juniorendriedaagse
2020
 UEC European Junior Track Championships
1st  Scratch
1st  Omnium
 1st  Time trial, National Junior Road Championships
2021
 1st Prologue (TTT) Tour Alsace
 1st Stage 2 Tour du Pays de Montbéliard
 Flanders Tomorrow Tour
 Sprints classification
1st Stage 1 
 6th Time trial, National Under-23 Road Championships
 10th Coppa della Pace
2022
 National Under-23 Road Championships
2nd Road race
8th Time trial
 9th Overall Tour de Bretagne
 9th Overall Tour de l'Avenir
1st Prologue (TTT)

References

External links

2002 births
Living people
Dutch male cyclists
People from Zoetermeer